The 2008 Division 1 was contested by 28 teams divided into two groups geographically. Syrianska FC and FC Trollhättan won their respective groups, and thereby were promoted to Superettan for the 2009 season. Vasalunds IF who finished second in the northern group were also promoted after winning their playoff.

League tables

North

Group South

Season statistics

Northern group top scorers

Southern group top scorers

Young Player Teams of the Year

At the end of each Division 1 season an all-star game is played called "Morgondagens Stjärnor" (English: "The Stars Of Tomorrow"). The two teams playing against each other consist of the best young players from each of the two leagues.

References
Sweden - List of final tables (Clas Glenning)

Swedish Football Division 1 seasons
3
Sweden
Sweden